The Kilbourn Bridge is located just south of Kilbourn, Iowa, United States. In 1890 the Van Buren County Board of Supervisors contracted with the Western Bridge Company of Chicago to build a bridge at the Kilbourn ferry crossing. It was destroyed in a flood in 1903. The Board of Supervisors put off replacing the bridge until 1907, and then all the proposals came over the $20,000 limit. The following the year they removed the limit. The six-span bridge was designed by the Iowa State Highway Commission (ISHC), and built by the Ottumwa Supply and Construction Company of Ottumwa, Iowa. It was the first large-scale engineering project undertaken by the newly formed ISHC. The Kilbourn Bridge was listed on the National Register of Historic Places in 1998.

See also
List of bridges documented by the Historic American Engineering Record in Iowa

References

External links

Bridges completed in 1909
Bridges in Van Buren County, Iowa
Historic American Engineering Record in Iowa
National Register of Historic Places in Van Buren County, Iowa
Road bridges on the National Register of Historic Places in Iowa
Truss bridges in Iowa
Pratt truss bridges in the United States